Scene 20: 20th Anniversary Concert is a live album by the progressive bluegrass Maryland band The Seldom Scene.

Track listing
 Introduction  00:43
 I Haven't Got the Right to Love You (Buchanan, Claude) 03:05
 Gardens and Memories (Starling) 03:42
 House of Gold (Williams) 04:08
 Pictures from Life's Other Side (Traditional) 06:02
 Satan's Jeweled Crown (Eden) 04:27
 Will You Be Ready to Go Home (Williams) 03:02
 Mean Mother Blues (Starling) 03:58
 Were You There When They Crucified My Lord? (Traditional) 04:09
 The Weary Pilgrim (Rosenthal) 03:17
 Leavin' Harlan (Rosenthal) 05:07
 Take Him In (Rosenthal) 03:19
 Stompin' at the Savoy (Goodman, Razaf, Sampson, Webb) 03:52
 Something in the Wind (Rosenthal) 04:07
 Muddy Water (Rosenthal) 03:41
 Open Up the Window, Noah (Rosenthal) 02:59
 Breakin' New Ground (Carl Jackson, Jerry Salley) 04:19
 Old Train (Herb Pedersen, Nikki Pedersen) 02:13
 Wait a Minute (Herb Pedersen) 04:59
 Blue Ridge Cabin Home (Certain, Stacey) 03:11
 Gypsy Moon (Coleman, Reid) 04:36
 Walk Through This World with Me (Savage, Seamons) 02:43
 In the Pines (Traditional) 04:39
 And on Bass (Coleman) 04:01
 Another Lonesome Day (Thatcher) 02:33
 Have Mercy on My Soul (Coleman, Reid) 03:33
 House of the Rising Sun/Walk Don't Run (Smith, Traditional) 08:32
 In the Midnight Hour (Steve Cropper, Wilson Pickett) 03:34

Personnel
 Lou Reid - vocals, guitar, mandolin
 John Duffey - mandolin, vocals
 Ben Eldridge - banjo, guitar, vocals
 Mike Auldridge - Dobro, guitar, vocals
 T. Michael Coleman - bass, vocals

References

External links
Official site

The Seldom Scene albums
1992 live albums
Sugar Hill Records live albums